Voskanyan is an Armenian surname. Notable people with the surname include:

Andranik Voskanyan (born 1990), Armenian footballer
Aram Voskanyan (born 1975), Armenian footballer
Arthur Voskanyan (born 1976), Armenian footballer
Masis Voskanyan (born 1990), Armenian footballer
Taron Voskanyan (born 1993), Armenian footballer
Vardan Voskanyan (born 1972), Armenian judoka

See also
 Varujan Vosganian (born 1958), Romanian politician

Armenian-language surnames